Aleksandar Madžar (Cyrillic: Александар Маџар; born 21 August 1978) is a retired footballer.

External links
 Aleksandar Madzar at MaltaFootball.com 
 Profile at Playerhistory

1978 births
Living people
People from Bar, Montenegro
Association football forwards
Serbia and Montenegro footballers
Montenegrin footballers
FK Mornar players
Red Star Belgrade footballers
FK Palilulac Beograd players
OFK Kikinda players
Ferencvárosi TC footballers
FK Radnički 1923 players
FK Hajduk Beograd players
FK Radnički Niš players
FK BSK Batajnica players
FK Borac Čačak players
AEP Paphos FC players
FK Voždovac players
FC Vaslui players
Sliema Wanderers F.C. players
Marsaxlokk F.C. players
Floriana F.C. players
FK Mogren players
Second League of Serbia and Montenegro players
First League of Serbia and Montenegro players
Cypriot First Division players
Liga I players
Maltese Premier League players
Montenegrin First League players
Serbia and Montenegro expatriate footballers
Expatriate footballers in Hungary
Serbia and Montenegro expatriate sportspeople in Hungary
Expatriate footballers in Cyprus
Serbia and Montenegro expatriate sportspeople in Cyprus
Montenegrin expatriate footballers
Expatriate footballers in Romania
Montenegrin expatriate sportspeople in Romania
Expatriate footballers in Malta
Montenegrin expatriate sportspeople in Malta
Montenegrin football managers
FK Mornar managers